Yale Wright Laboratory (Wright Lab) is a facility and research community at Yale University in New Haven, CT.  Wright Lab enables researchers to develop, build and use research instrumentation for experiments in nuclear, particle and astrophysics across the globe that investigate the invisible universe.  Before a transformation to its current purpose in 2017, Wright Lab was known as the Arthur W. Wright Nuclear Structure Laboratory (WNSL).  WNSL housed the first "Emperor" tandem Van de Graaff heavy ion accelerator and was founded by D. Allan Bromley, the "father of heavy-ion physics," in 1961 (see History, below, for more information).

Facilities 
Wright Lab is named for Arthur Williams Wright, who was awarded one of the first three Ph.D.s in science in the Americas (all of which were awarded by Yale University in 1861).  The building complex joins two buildings that were constructed and renovated at different times, for different purposes, yet always related to Yale physics research.

 The first part of the complex (what is now called the Wright Lab Connector) was built sometime before or during the 1940s and housed an electron linear accelerator (linac).    
 The second part of the complex (what is now called Wright Lab West) was built in the 1950s to house the heavy ion linear accelerator (HILAC).
 The third part of the complex (what is now called Wright Lab)  was built in the 1960s, with all three buildings joined together as the A. W. Wright Nuclear Structure Laboratory, to house and operate the Yale MP-1 "Emperor" tandem Van de Graaff heavy ion accelerator.
 The entire complex was renovated from 2013-17 to transform the facility into its current purpose and re-named as the Yale Wright Laboratory (Wright Lab).

History 
The history of Wright Lab begins with the creation of accelerator physics in the 1920s, continues with the creation of the Arthur W. Wright Nuclear Structure Laboratory (WNSL) to operate the Yale MP-1 "Emperor" tandem Van de Graaff heavy ion accelerator from 1966 until 2011, and continues further with its transformation into the new Wright Lab, which was dedicated in 2017, to enable Wright Lab's research program in nuclear, particle and astrophysics.  A brief timeline is below.

Directors of WNSL and Wright Lab

References

Yale University
Laboratories in the United States
Nuclear research institutes
Particle physics facilities
New Haven County, Connecticut
Institutes associated with CERN
Physics institutes